Rosenmontag (English: Love's Carnival) is a 1924 German silent romance film directed by Rudolf Meinert and starring Gerd Briese, Helga Thomas and Maria Reisenhofer. It was based on a 1900 play of the same title by Otto Erich Hartleben.

Cast
Gerd Briese
Helga Thomas
Maria Reisenhofer
Charles Willy Kayser   
Franz Schönfeld
F.W. Schröder-Schrom
Alfred Braun
Rio Nobile
Otto Reinwald
Ernst Nessler  
Jutta Jol
Adele Reuter-Eichberg
Rudolf Maas

See also
Love's Carnival (1930)
Love's Carnival (1955)

References

External links

1924 films
1924 romantic drama films
German romantic drama films
Films of the Weimar Republic
German silent feature films
Films directed by Rudolf Meinert
German films based on plays
German black-and-white films
Silent romantic drama films
1920s German films